Dimitar Aleksiev (born 28 July 1993) is a Bulgarian footballer who plays for Sayana Haskovo as a forward.

Career

Early career
Dimitar Aleksiev started his youth career at Sliven. At the beginning of his professional career Aleksiev played for Lyubimets 2007 and Dimitrovgrad.

Haskovo
Dimitar Aleksiev spent two years at Haskovo. He joined the team before the start of season 2013-14 and helped the team to finish on 2nd place in B Grupa and to win a promotion for A Grupa. He was selected for the best played of the season as well as best young player of the season in B Grupa.

Dimitar Aleksiev played in 20 games in A Grupa and scored 5 goals for Haskovo during the 2014-15 season. Despite his efforts the team was relegated to B Grupa and Aleksiev left after the end of the season.

Botev Plovdiv
On 24 June 2015 Aleksiev joined Botev Plovdiv as a free agent and signed a two-year contract. A week later he made an unofficial debut when he came on as a substitute during the second half of the friendly game with FC Oborishte. Botev Plovdiv won with 3-1 and Aleksiev scored one of the goals.

After a long absence from the first team squad, on 30 October, Aleksiev came on as a substitute during the second half of the 2-0 away defeat of Botev Plovdiv from Slavia Sofia.

On 13 January 2016 Aleksiev was released from Botev Plovdiv after playing only 4 games for the club without scoring any goals in official games.

Lokomotiv GO
On 18 January 2016 Aleksiev signed for Lokomotiv GO, but was released six months later.

Oborishte
On 16 January 2017 Aleksiev joined Oborishte.

Arda Kardzhali
On 21 June 2017 he joined Third League club Arda Kardzhali.

References

External links 
 

1993 births
Living people
Bulgarian footballers
FC Lyubimets players
FC Haskovo players
Botev Plovdiv players
FC Lokomotiv Gorna Oryahovitsa players
Vigor Lamezia players
FC Oborishte players
FC Arda Kardzhali players
FC Botev Galabovo players
OFC Pirin Blagoevgrad players
PFC Dobrudzha Dobrich players
FC Sportist Svoge players
First Professional Football League (Bulgaria) players
Association football forwards